Samuel Graham (born 13 August 2000) is an English professional footballer who plays as a defender for Rochdale.

Career

Sheffield United
On 10 March 2017, Graham signed his first professional contract with Sheffield United, signing a deal until 2020. On 24 March 2018, he joined National League side FC Halifax Town on loan until the end of the season. Graham was loaned out to Oldham Athletic on 6 July 2018

On 31 January 2019, Graham was loaned out to Australian side Central Coast Mariners for the remainder of the 2018–19 A-League season.

On 5 August 2019, Graham was loaned out to Notts County for the 2019–20 season.

On 8 September 2020, the loan was extended.

Rochdale
On 29 July 2021, Graham signed a two-year contract with Rochdale.

On 23 March 2022, Graham returned to Notts County for a third loan spell with the club, this time until the end of the 2021–22 season.

References

External links
Sam Graham profile at the Sheffield United F.C. website

2000 births
Living people
English footballers
Association football midfielders
Sheffield United F.C. players
FC Halifax Town players 
Oldham Athletic A.F.C. players
Central Coast Mariners FC players
Notts County F.C. players
Rochdale A.F.C. players
English Football League players
National League (English football) players
A-League Men players
English expatriate footballers
English expatriate sportspeople in Australia
Expatriate soccer players in Australia